Fahd bin Badr Al Saud is a Saudi Arabian politician who served as the governor of Al Jawf Province from 2002 to 2018. He is a member of the House of Saud and the son of Prince Badr bin Abdulaziz. Prince Fahd succeeded his uncle Prince Abdul Elah bin Abdulaziz as governor of Al Jawf. He was the deputy governor of the region before his appointment. In February 2018, Prince Fahd was appointed an advisor to King Salman.

Personal life
He is married to Princess Sarah bint Abdullah bin Abdulaziz, a daughter of King Abdullah who ruled Saudi Arabia between 2005 and 2015. They have five children.

References

Fahd
Fahd
Fahd
Living people
Year of birth missing (living people)

ar:فهد بن بدر عبد العزيز آل سعود